Jordan William Hunter Luck  (born 15 October 1961) is the former lead singer and songwriter of the New Zealand rock band The Exponents. He was born in Vanderhoof in the province of British Columbia, Canada.  His family moved to Tokarahi (near Oamaru) and later moved to Geraldine where he grew up. He attended University of Canterbury and College House. He is now in a band called The Jordan Luck Band.

At the 2007 APRA Silver Scroll Awards on 18 September, Luck was named as the first inductee to the New Zealand Music Hall of Fame. He was appointed a Member of the New Zealand Order of Merit for services to music in the 2012 Queen's Birthday and Diamond Jubilee Honours.

In 2019, Luck would cover Al Park's "I Walked Away" for the covers collection Better Already - The Songs Of Al Park. Park, a singer-songwriter sometimes credited as the father figure for the 'Lyttelton Sound' and the first guy to bring punk music to Otautahi, had featured in the video for "Victoria", a top ten hit in 1982 for Luck and his band The Dance Exponents.

Also in 2019, Luck would tour New Zealand with The Jordan Luck Band, starting off at Peach & Porker in Te Awamutu on 23 February 2019 and ending the tour in Christchurch on 22 June 2019.

Discography

Singles

See also
 The Exponents

Awards

Aotearoa Music Awards
The Aotearoa Music Awards (previously known as New Zealand Music Awards (NZMA)) are an annual awards night celebrating excellence in New Zealand music and have been presented annually since 1965.

! 
|-
| 2007 || Jordan Luck || New Zealand Music Hall of Fame ||  || 
|-
| 2015 || Jordan Luck (as part of The Exponents) || New Zealand Music Hall of Fame ||  || 
|-

References
Jordan Luck bio on Luck Website

External links

1961 births
APRA Award winners
People from the Regional District of Bulkley-Nechako
Canadian emigrants to New Zealand
Members of the New Zealand Order of Merit
University of Canterbury alumni
Living people
New Zealand male singer-songwriters
New Zealand male guitarists
20th-century New Zealand  male singers
21st-century New Zealand  male singers
20th-century guitarists
21st-century guitarists